Keith Toston (born May 6, 1987) is a professional Canadian football running back who is currently a free agent. After playing college football at Oklahoma State, Toston was undrafted in the 2010 NFL Draft and was signed by the St. Louis Rams on April 25, 2010.

Early years
At Angleton High School, Toston carried the ball 156 times for 1,564 yards and scored 18 touchdowns as a senior and averaged just over 10 yards per carry and as a junior, carried the ball 225 times for 1,529 yards and scored 15 touchdowns. He was a finalist for the Old Spice National High School Player of the Year award, and was District 24-4A offensive MVP as well as named all-Greater Houston and included on the Dallas Morning News' top 100 list.

College career
Toston played college football at Oklahoma State. In 2006, as a freshman, Tosten finished with 631 rushing yards with an average of 6.0 yards per rush and six touchdowns in 12 games. In his sophomore year he fumbled the ball twice in the Troy game, causing him to fall to third string the rest of the year. In his junior year he was second string, but rose to the challenge in his senior campaign when Kendall Hunter went down with a knee injury. In 2009 as a senior he was a first-team All-Big 12 running back.

Toston was selected to play in the 85th annual East-West Shrine Game, which was played January 23, 2010, in Orlando, Florida.

Toston accumulated 473 attempts, 2725 yards, and 27 rushing touchdowns in his career at Oklahoma State.

Professional career

Pre-draft

St. Louis Rams
Toston was signed by the St. Louis Rams on April 25, 2010, and made the Rams' opening-day roster in 2010. Toston spent the year as the Rams' secondary back. He accumulated 54 yards on 19 carries in spot duty. On September 3, 2011, the Rams cut Toston.

Jacksonville Jaguars
Toston was signed by the Jacksonville Jaguars on August 2, 2012

Saskatchewan Roughriders
On April 4th 2014 Toston was signed by the Saskatchewan Roughriders to a 2-year deal.

References

External links
Saskatchewan Roughriders bio 
Jacksonville Jaguars bio
Oklahoma State Cowboys bio

1987 births
Living people
Angleton High School alumni
American football running backs
Oklahoma State Cowboys football players
St. Louis Rams players
Jacksonville Jaguars players
Saskatchewan Roughriders players
Calgary Stampeders players